Highland Beach is a town in Palm Beach County, Florida, United States. It is situated 49 miles north of Miami and 20 miles south of Palm Beach. As of the 2010 census, the population was 3,539.

History

Highland Beach was incorporated in 1949. The town was named for its relatively elevated town site.

Geography

Demographics

2020 census

As of the 2020 United States census, there were 4,295 people, 2,060 households, and 1,243 families residing in the town.

2000 census

At the 2000 census there were 3,775 people, 2,192 households, and 1,227 families in the town. The racial makeup of the town was 98.33% White (95.6% were Non-Hispanic White,) 0.37% African American, 0.05% Native American, 0.37% Asian, 0.11% from other races, and 0.77% from two or more races. Hispanic or Latino of any race were 2.97%.

Of the 2,192 households 4.6% had children under the age of 18 living with them, 53.2% were married couples living together, 1.5% had a female householder with no husband present, and 44.0% were non-families. 38.1% of households were one person and 23.4% were one person aged 65 or older.  The average household size was 1.72 and the average family size was 2.15.

The age distribution was 3.9% under the age of 18, 1.4% from 18 to 24, 12.7% from 25 to 44, 28.8% from 45 to 64, and 53.3% 65 or older.  The median age was 66 years. For every 100 females, there were 88.4 males.  For every 100 females age 18 and over, there were 87.8 males.

The median household income was $72,989 and the median family income  was $95,217. Males had a median income of $87,160 versus $40,357 for females. The per capita income for the town was $67,288.  None of the families and 2.1% of the population were living below the poverty line, including no under eighteens and 2.0% of those over 64.

As of 2000, speakers of English as a first language accounted for 90.63% of all residents, while German accounted for 3.26%, Spanish consisted of 2.22%, French was at 2.08%, and Yiddish made up 1.78% of the population.

As of 2000, Highland Beach had the tenth highest percentage of Austrian residents in the US, with 4.0% of the populace (tied with Mondovi, Wisconsin.) Although the language percentages of Highland Beach didn't necessarily reflect the residents' ancestry, it had the thirty-sixth highest percentage of Russian residents in the US, at 10.90% of the town's population (tied with Atlantic Beach, New York,) and the seventh highest percentage of Turkish residents in the US, at 1.20% of its population (tied with five other US areas, including Bay Harbor Islands.)

Highland Beach has only two businesses, which keeps the city mostly residential.  The two businesses are The Delray Sands Resort and John P O'Grady Realty.   The Delray Sands Resort was formerly the Holiday Inn.  Both businesses operate out of the same building.  They have been in existence several decades.

References

External links
 

Towns in Palm Beach County, Florida
Seaside resorts in Florida
Populated coastal places in Florida on the Atlantic Ocean
Towns in Florida
Beaches of Palm Beach County, Florida
Beaches of Florida